ROKS Munmu the Great (DDH-976) is a  in the South Korean navy. It was named after the Korean king Munmu of Silla.

Design 
The KDX-II is part of a much larger build up program aimed at turning the ROKN into a blue-water navy. It is said to be the first stealthy major combatant in the ROKN and was designed to significantly increase the ROKN's capabilities.

Construction and career 
In March 2009, Munmu the Great was sent overseas to protect merchant vessels from Somali pirates. On 28 May 2007 during firing exercise on the open sea near Jinhae one of the projectiles exploded inside the 127 mm gun barrel which has been replaced later.

In April 2018, it was deployed to Ghana with personnel from the Special Warfare Brigade as part of a mission to rescue kidnapped South Korean fishermen.

On 19 July, 2021, it is reported that 247 out of 301 crew members of the 34th contingent of the Cheonghae Unit on the Munmu the Great was tested positive for the covid-19. Two Korean Air Force KC-330 departed with 200 replacement members to transport the 301 entire crew members back to South Korea. After returning to South Korea, it is revealed that 270 crew members are tested positive.

Gallery

See also 
 Cheonghae Unit
 Korean Destroyer eXperimental
  (KD-I)
  (KD-III)

References

Further reading

External links

Chungmugong Yi Sun-shin-class destroyers
Ships built by Hyundai Heavy Industries Group
2003 ships